Archbishop Spyridon may refer to:

 Archbishop Spyridon of America
 Archbishop Spyridon of Athens

See also 
 Spyridon